Williamstown is a village in the Rhondda Valley in the county borough of Rhondda Cynon Taf, within the historic county boundaries of Glamorgan, Wales. Williamstown was founded in the 1870s, is located at the foot of Mynydd Dinas and is a district of neighbouring village Penygraig.

Early history
Before the Rhondda was industrialised in the mid to late 19th century, the area where Williamstown now resides, was made up of woodlands occupied by sparsely populated farmlands. Williamstown exhibits very little evidence of early habitation, a few Bronze Age cairns have been discovered on Mynydd Dinas, but most hafodi and farm houses tended to group around the River Rhondda located lower down the valley.

Much of the land in the Rhondda, once controlled by individual farmers, had been bought up by wealthy absentee landlords by the start of the 19th century. The land which would become Williamstown was bought by Walter Coffin, the pioneer of coal mining in the Rhondda, around the 1850s. In 1867 this land was inherited by the Williams family, through their father, a cousin of Coffin. The Williams family gave their name to the town that was built on their land and among the trustees of the family was Caroline Elizabeth Williams, Arthur John Williams and Morgan Bransby Williams.

External links
 Rhondda Cynon Taf Library Services, Heritage Trail:Penygraig

References

Villages in Rhondda Cynon Taf